Bob Mills may refer to:

 Bob Mills (comedian) (born 1957), British comedian and radio presenter
 Bob Mills (politician) (born 1941), Canadian politician

See also 
 Robert Mills (disambiguation)
 List of people named Mills